The 2015–16 season of the Belgian Second Division (also known as Proximus League for sponsorship reasons) began on 8 August 2015 and ended in April 2016.

Structural changes
This season was the last under the name Second Division. Starting from 2016-17 the league is known as First Division B as a result of reforms in the Belgian league system. The champions were promoted and 9 teams  relegated to the third division named Amateur First Division or Amateur Superleague, while no team was promoted from the lower division. Promotion playoffs were not played and three-period rankings were not applied.

Team changes
After promotion and relegation, only 11 teams of the previous season remained in the league, with 5 others being replaced. One team was not replaced, thus reducing the competition to 17 teams.

Out
 STVV were promoted as champions of the previous season.
  Leuven were promoted after winning the promotion playoffs.
 Woluwe-Zaventem were relegated to the Third Division after finishing 18th and for not applying for a license.
 KRC Mechelen were relegated to the Third Division after finishing 17th and for not applying for a license.
 Eendracht Aalst were relegated after failing to obtain a license.
 Mons folded as a team.

In
 Cercle Brugge were relegated from the Belgian Pro League after finishing in last place.
 Lierse were relegated from the Belgian Pro League after finishing third in the playoffs.
 Coxyde were promoted as champions from Third Division A.
 Union SG were promoted as runner-up from Third Division B, after champions Cappellen did not apply for a license.
 Deinze were promoted after winning the third division playoffs.

Team information

Personnel and kits

League table

Results

References

Belgian Second Division seasons
Bel
2